Margaret Anne Ewing (née McAdam, formerly Bain; 1 September 1945 – 21 March 2006) was a Scottish teacher, journalist and politician. She served as a Scottish National Party (SNP) Member of Parliament for East Dunbartonshire from 1974 to 1979 and Moray from 1987 to 2001, and was the Member of the Scottish Parliament (MSP) for Moray from 1999 until 2006.

Ewing was Deputy Leader of the Scottish National Party from 1984 to 1987 and leader of the SNP parliamentary group in the House of Commons from 1987 to 1999. She was a candidate for the SNP leadership in 1990.

Early life and career
Ewing was born Margaret Anne McAdam in Lanark, the daughter of John McAdam, a farm labourer. She was educated at Biggar High School. At the age of twelve she was diagnosed with tuberculosis with a thirteen-month stay in hospital on account of this. She went on to study at the University of Glasgow, graduating with an MA degree in English language and literature.

She was an English teacher at St Modan's High School in Stirling from 1970 to 1973, before serving as principal teacher of remedial education from 1973 to 1974.

Political career
Ewing joined the Scottish National Party as a student in 1966 and was president of the student group at the university. She was elected as Member of Parliament (MP) for East Dunbartonshire at the October 1974 election, by just 22 votes, when she was known as Margaret Bain; she had failed to win the seat at the previous election in February. In 1976 during a devolution debate she told the House of Commons that she identified as a Scot, a European and "a citizen of the world", but did not "feel British" and had "never identified... as British". At one point she burst into tears in the House of Commons when a devolution proposal was defeated. With the downturn in SNP electoral fortunes at the 1979 Election she lost her seat in the House of Commons. After working for a period as an administrator in social services in Glasgow, she unsuccessfully contested the Strathkelvin and Bearsden constituency at the 1983 Election.

Ewing then worked as a freelance journalist. Now known as Margaret Ewing, she was selected by the SNP as their candidate for Moray at the 1987 election. She was re-elected to Westminster and again in 1992 and 1997, holding this seat until standing down at the 2001 general election to concentrate on Holyrood. She stood for the leadership of the SNP in 1990 but lost out to Alex Salmond despite the backing of many prominent SNP members (such as Jim Sillars). Ewing had become leader of the SNP's parliamentary group after the 1987 election. The leadership vacancy was caused by the fact that the SNP Chairman Gordon Wilson had lost his seat at Dundee Dundee East and previous group leader Donald Stewart had retired from parliament. While the three SNP MPs elected in 1987 had not been members of the previous parliament, both Ewing and Andrew Welsh had served in parliament in the past. A post-election meeting held at Perth between Ewing, Welsh, Salmond (newly elected as MP for Banff and Buchan) and Wilson led to Ewing's appointment with Welsh becoming the group's chief whip.

In 1999, at the first Scottish Parliament election she was returned to represent Moray. She was returned again in 2003.

In August 2005, Ewing had announced that she was not seeking re-election at the 2007 Scottish Parliament elections. The SNP comfortably retained her vacant seat at the by-election which took place on 27 April 2006.

Death
Ewing died from breast cancer, aged 60, on 21 March 2006.

Family
She was married twice: firstly to Donald Bain, a SNP research officer in 1968 (divorced 1980), and secondly to Fergus Ewing in 1983, who is the son of Winnie Ewing and who also became a Member of the Scottish Parliament. Her sister-in-law Annabelle Ewing is also an SNP politician.

References

External links 
 
 
SNP tribute page
SNP veteran Margaret Ewing dies (BBC)
Times obituary
Telegraph obituary

|-

1945 births
2006 deaths
People educated at Biggar High School
Deaths from breast cancer
Members of the Parliament of the United Kingdom for Scottish constituencies
Female members of the Parliament of the United Kingdom for Scottish constituencies
Politics of Moray
Scottish journalists
Scottish women journalists
Scottish National Party MPs
Scottish National Party MSPs
Scottish schoolteachers
Alumni of the University of Glasgow
Alumni of the University of Strathclyde
UK MPs 1974–1979
UK MPs 1987–1992
UK MPs 1992–1997
UK MPs 1997–2001
Members of the Scottish Parliament 1999–2003
Members of the Scottish Parliament 2003–2007
Female members of the Scottish Parliament
20th-century Scottish women politicians